Petrolheads is a BBC television panel game presented by Neil Morrissey, with team captains Richard Hammond and Chris Barrie. The show pitted motoring wits against each other and included car stunts shot on location.  There were two guests each episode. The show was produced by Brian Klein (Top Gear), directed by John L Spencer and executive producers were Marie-Claire Walton and Steve Ayres. The theme music was by British composer Leigh Haggerwood. It was created and scripted by author Norman Giller, with input from Top Gear writer Richard Porter and comedy scriptwriter Ged Parsons.

Episode list
The coloured backgrounds denote the result of each of the shows:

 – Indicates Chris's team won
 – Indicates Richard's team won

References

External links

2006 British television series debuts
2006 British television series endings
BBC panel games
BBC television game shows
British panel games
2000s British game shows
Automotive television series